George Harry Mullin  (15 August 1891 – 5 April 1963) was an American-Canadian soldier in the Canadian army. Mullin was a recipient of the Victoria Cross, the highest award for gallantry in the face of the enemy that can be awarded to British and Commonwealth forces.

Details
Mullun was born in Portland, Oregon, and his parents brought him to Moosomin, Saskatchewan at the age of two. He enlisted in the Army in December 1914.

Action
He was 26 years old, and a sergeant in Princess Patricia's Canadian Light Infantry, Canadian Expeditionary Force during the First World War when the following deed took place for which he was awarded the VC.

On 30 October 1917 at Passchendaele, Belgium, Sergeant Mullin single-handed captured a pill-box which had withstood heavy bombardment and was causing heavy casualties and holding up the attack. He rushed the snipers' post in front, destroyed the garrison with bombs, shot two gunners and then compelled the remaining 10 men to surrender. All the time rapid fire was directed on him and his clothes were riddled with bullets, but he never faltered in his purpose and he not only helped to save the situation but indirectly saved many lives.

Citation

The citation reads:

Further Information
Mullin had earlier received the Military Medal and finished the war as a lieutenant. In 1934 he was appointed as Sergeant at Arms of the Saskatchewan legislature. Mullin served as a captain in the Veterans Guard during the Second World War. He was also a father of 4 and a loving husband.

Mullin is commemorated with the two-block long residential street 'Mullin Avenue' in the south central part of Regina, Saskatchewan.

Mullin is buried at Moosomin South Side Cemetery, Moosomin, Saskatchewan, Canada in the Legion Plot (approximately N 50.13409 W 101.68206
).

His Victoria Cross is displayed at the Museum of the Regiments in Calgary, Alberta, Canada.

References

Further reading 
Monuments to Courage (David Harvey, 1999)
The Register of the Victoria Cross (This England, 1997)
VCs of the First World War - Passchendaele 1917 (Stephen Snelling, 1998)

External links

 George Mullin's digitized service file
George Harry Mullin biography on DHH

1890s births
1963 deaths
American emigrants to Canada
Canadian Expeditionary Force soldiers
Canadian World War I recipients of the Victoria Cross
Canadian recipients of the Military Medal
Military personnel from Portland, Oregon
People from Moosomin, Saskatchewan
Princess Patricia's Canadian Light Infantry officers
Canadian military personnel of World War I
Princess Patricia's Canadian Light Infantry